Inventing Our Life: The Kibbutz Experiment is a 2010 documentary film directed by Toby Perl Freilich.

The film examines the 100-year history of Israel's kibbutz movement as a modern generation struggles to ensure its survival amidst painful reforms and a new capitalist reality.  Among those interviewed are first, second and third generation members from kibbutzim like Degania, the flagship commune established in 1910; Hulda, once near collapse and recently privatized; Sasa, the first to be settled entirely by Americans and today Israel's wealthiest kibbutz; and Tamuz, an urban kibbutz founded in 1987 and located in Beit Shemesh.

Critical reception
The film received generally favorable reviews from critics. At Rotten Tomatoes, the film holds a rating of 82%, based on 11 reviews and an average rating of 7.3/10. It also has a score of 67 on Metacritic based on 6 reviews.

References

External links
 
 
 
 

2010s Hebrew-language films
Israeli documentary films
2010 films
Films about the kibbutz